Oberleutnant Herbert Schmid (1 April 1914 – 1975) was a German World War II pilot who defected to north-east Scotland in May 1943, piloting a German nightfighter with advanced interception radar which allowed British scientists to jam German nightfighter radar.

Early life
He was born in Saxony-Anhalt. His father was the secretary to the German Chancellor and Foreign Minister, Gustav Stresemann

Career
He was a pilot in the Luftwaffe, serving with Nachtjagdgeschwader 3 (NJG 3).

May 1943 defection to Scotland

On 9 May 1943, at age 29, Schmid took his Junkers Ju 88 R-1 (360043), equipped with the most advanced German nightfighter interception radar, to an RAF station at Aberdeen. He had set off from Aalborg in Denmark at 1503, flying to Norway to refuel at 1603. It took off at 1650 to take part in a mission over the Skagerrak, between Norway and Denmark. At 1710, a false message was sent to the German nightfighter headquarters in Denmark, saying that the aircraft's starboard engine was on fire; the aircraft dropped down to sea level and dropped three life rafts.

Interception
Two Spitfires from 165 Squadron were sent to intercept the Ju-88, making contact with the Ju-88 at 1805, west of Aberdeen; the Ju-88 dropped its flaps and undercarriage and launched red flares. The Ju-88 landed at Aberdeen at 1820. One of the German aircrew was not compliant following the landing and had to be taken at gunpoint.

Schmid was detained as a prisoner of war, after being detained in the Officer's Mess for a week with the other crew of his aircraft.

Aircraft testing
Once the aircraft was captured, German nightfighters could be detected much earlier. The aircraft was flown to many times, behind a Vickers Wellington that dropped the tin foil window. The radar-jamming technique known as window was found to work. The previous year, Wellington DV819 of No. 1474 Flight (part of 192 Squadron) had attempted the world's first Ferret mission, from RAF Gransden Lodge in Huntingdonshire on 3 December 1942, to find German AI radar; the aircraft came under attack by a Luftwaffe Ju 88 nightfighter, and shot down on the Kent coast; the captured Ju 88 would find the radar system that this Wellington had been trying to find in December 1942.

Aircraft
Within five days the Ju-88 had been given the designation PJ876, later being tested at RAF Collyweston in Northamptonshire. The aircraft was moved to the RAF Museum in London in November 1978, when the museum opened.

See also
 16 April 1943 in the early hours; twelve Focke-Wulf Fw 190 A4 Luftwaffe aircraft had followed RAF bombers home from Germany to Essex; four of the Fw 190 aircraft had crossed the Thames estuary and believing it was the English Channel, the aircraft mistakenly landed at RAF West Malling; one crashed with the pilot killed, but the other three pilots were captured, with Feldwebel Otto Bechtold from Schnellkampfgeschwader 10
 13 July 1944 landing at RAF Woodbridge in Suffolk of a Nachtjagdgeschwader 2 (NJG 2) Ju-88G, also carrying advanced radar, piloted by Unteroffizier Hans Mackle, Obergefreiter Heinz Olze and Obergefreiter Hans Mockle
 21 July 1944 at around 0300, two Messerschmitt Bf 109 (G) aircraft landed at RAF Manston in Kent, piloted by Leutnant Horst Prenzel and Feldwebel Manfred Gromill of Jagdgeschwader 301 (JG 301)
 Helmuth Pohle, led the first German aerial attack on the UK, in Scotland, on 16 October 1939 in a Ju 88, later taken prisoner-of-war

References

External links
 1943 defection

1914 births
Aviation history of Scotland
German defectors
German emigrants to the United Kingdom
German prisoners of war in World War II held by the United Kingdom
German World War II fighter pilots
History of Aberdeen
Military history of Denmark during World War II
Military history of Scotland
People from Saxony-Anhalt
Technical intelligence during World War II
World War II German radars
World War II strategic bombing of Germany
Year of death missing